Bissingen may refer to:

Bissingen, Bavaria, municipality in Bavaria, Germany
Bissingen an der Teck, municipality in Esslingen district, Baden-Württemberg, Germany
Bietigheim-Bissingen, town in Ludwigsburg district, Baden-Württemberg, Germany
FSV 08 Bissingen, an association football club based in Bietigheim-Bissingen